Jalan Lama Bukit Putus, Federal Route 361 (formerly Federal Route 51, is a federal road in Negeri Sembilan, Malaysia passing Bukit Putus.  This 7 km (4.3 miles) road was an old stretch of the Federal Route 51 is notorious for its narrow and dangerous sharp corners.

The Kilometre Zero is located at the junctions of the Federal Route 51 at Bukit Putus (West). This stretch of the road was infamous for its winding section, sharp corners, and occasional landslides as it is located at the edge of a cliff known as Bukit Putus. Because of this, a less winding 6.7km piece of road on the Jalan Kuala Pilah was built to bypass the dangerous Bukit Putus section, which would lead to the construction of the third highest bridge in Malaysia, Bukit Putus Viaduct.

The road was constructed by British in the 1920s. In July 2014, the old stretch of the Bukit Putus (Federal Route 51) was gazetted as Federal Route 361.
Even though Jalan Kuala Pilah  is safer, many people (especially cyclists) often use this road instead. This road is also home to a few attractions such as Starfresh Agro Park and a scout camp. There are hiking trails at Bukit Putus that can be accessed from this road.
Many people also use this road as an alternative whenever the main road to Kuala Pilah  is experiencing congestion

At most sections, the Federal Route 361 was built under the JKR R5 road standard, with a speed limit of 90 km/h.

List of junctions and towns

References

Malaysian Federal Roads